Hotel electric power (HEP) is electricity generated and used by a vehicle, especially a ship, truck, submarine or some turbo prop aircraft without APU generator  for purposes other than propulsion such as climate control, communications, entertainment, lighting, refrigeration, water desalination and treatment, etc. The electrical load of such systems is termed the "hotel load".

Not having a separate auxiliary power unit saves weight in turbo-prop aircraft such as the ATR 72 and ATR 42, where a propeller brake is used to allow the turbine to continue running without the propeller spinning in "hotel mode".

In a railway context a passenger train uses head-end power (also abbreviated to HEP) for functions such as climate control (heating and air conditioning), cooking, lighting, and water heating.

See also 
 Auxiliary power unit
 Head-end power
 HVAC

Electrical generators